Spartin is a protein that in humans is encoded by the SPG20 gene.

This gene encodes a protein that contains a MIT (Microtubule Interacting and Trafficking molecule) domain. This protein may be involved in endosomal trafficking, microtubule dynamics, or both functions. Spartin loss has been associated to mitochondrial dysfunction, impaired complex I activity and altered pyruvate metabolism.  Frameshift mutations associated with this gene cause autosomal recessive spastic paraplegia 20 (Troyer syndrome).
Troyer syndrome (SPG20) is a complicated type of hereditary spastic paraplegias (HSPs). HSP is a category of neurological disorder characterized by spasticity and muscle weakness in the lower limbs.

Background
The original description of this gene mutation and associated symptoms were described in 1967. This mutation is commonly found in high frequency with the Amish population. Newer studies have found that the mutation is not isolated to the Amish population, but also resides in the Omani population.

Presentation
This syndrome is not only characterized by  spasticity and weakness in the lower limbs, but also with dysarthria, mental retardation or mild developmental delay, and muscle wasting or muscle atrophy.

Physical
Individuals appear to have difficulty walking, and report a clumsy, spastic gait which worsens over time.  Some additional common physical features include overgrowth of the jaw bone, hammer toes, hand and feet abnormalities, and pes cavus.

Cognitive
Cognitive challenges, including developmental delay and difficulty with performance in school, may affect individuals with this syndrome.

Neurologic
Neurologic examination of individuals with this mutation may show dysmetria in the upper extremities, hyperreflexia, distal amyotrophy and ankle clonus, in addition to spasticity, weakness and dysarthria.

Diagnostic Imaging
The cerebellar vermis may present with mild atrophy and a loss of white matter volume.

Through Lifespan
Facial dysmorphism and subtle skeletal features are common in younger children. The condition progressively worsens, as spasticity and distal amyotrophy symptoms are revealed more in teenage years. SPG20 expression in the adult is relatively modest, however it is widespread in the nervous system. Longitudinal comparison of magnetic resonance imaging concluded that there was a progression of the syndrome; thus, the condition appears to worsen over time.

References

External links
  GeneReviews/NCBI/NIH/UW entry on Troyer Syndrome **

Further reading